Human Fertilisation and Embryology Act can refer to the following acts of the Parliament of the United Kingdom:
 Human Fertilisation and Embryology Act 1990
 Human Fertilisation and Embryology (Deceased Fathers) Act 2003
 Human Fertilisation and Embryology Act 2008, which updated and revised the 1990 Act

Lists of legislation by short title